Sir Richard Gardiner (died 19 December 1489) was, in 1478, elected Lord Mayor of London. He was Alderman of Walbrook Ward, and had been Sheriff of the City of London in 1469. He was also elected in 1478 a Member of Parliament for the City of London, one of the two aldermanic representatives of the city.

Life and death
Gardiner's parents were John and Isabella Gardiner of Exning, near Newmarket, Suffolk. He married Etheldreda (or Audrey) (who died in 1505), the daughter of William Cotton, Lord of the Manor of Landwade, in Cambridgeshire, who survived him and married, secondly, Sir Gilbert Talbot, Knight of the Garter, of Grafton, Worcestershire). By Audria, Gardiner had one child, Mary, who in 1504 married Sir Giles Alington, Knt.

"In his will, Richard Gardener [sic], Alderman of Walbrook Ward, left to Etheldreda or Audria, his wife, his lands, tenements, &c., in the parishes of St.Bartholomew the Less [towards the Royal Exchange], St.Michael Queenhithe, and Holy Trinity the Less, for her life, with remainder to Mary, Lady Alington, his daughter in tail [sic]. In default of an heir he leaves the sum of ten pence 'per diem' to five poor men in honour of the five wounds of Jesus Christ, and to five poor women in honour of the five joys of the Blessed Virgin Mary; the said men and women being nominated by the Mayor and Recorder, and by the Master of the House or Hospital of St.Thomas de Acon, in manner prescribed. The aforesaid tenements &c., to remain to the master of the house or hospital aforesaid and his successors subject to the above charge; remainder in case of default to the Chamberlain of the City of London on like condition. Dated 1 April 1488. Proved on Monday the Feast of St.Alphege, Bishop, 19 April 1490."

See also
 List of Sheriffs of the City of London
 List of Lord Mayors of London 
 City of London (elections to the Parliament of England)

References

 The Cambridgeshire Visitation by Henry St.George, 1619, from MSS. Phillipps, No.63, Edited by Sir T.P. Banks, Bart., and published by C.Gilmour, 1840.
 Dormant, Abeyant, Forfeited and Extinct Peerages of the British Empire by Sir Bernard Burke, C.B., LL.D., Ulster King of Arms, London, 1883, p. 4.
 Calendar of Wills proved and enrolled in the Court of Hustings, London, 1258 - 1688, edited by Reginald R. Sharpe, D.C.L., Barrister &c., London, 1890, Part II, 1358 - 1688, pps: 591-2.
 The Visitation of Cambridge, 1575 and 1619, by Henry St.George, Richmond Herald, and edited by John W. Clay, F.S.A., Harleian Society, London, 1897, pps: 22 and 128.
 The Gardiner Family History, by Michael Gardiner, London, 1989, page 7, (who gives as a source The Merchant Class of Medieval England, by Thrupp), pps:344-5, and 591.
 Cambridgeshire Family History Society Journal, August 1994, pps:285 - 292.
 Plantagenet Ancestry, by Douglas Richardson, Baltimore, Md., 2004, p. 705.
 Magna Carta Ancestry, by Douglas Richardson, Baltimore, Md.,2005, p. 810.

Year of birth unknown
1489 deaths
People from Newmarket, Suffolk
Sheriffs of the City of London
15th-century lord mayors of London
Members of the Parliament of England for the City of London
Knights Bachelor